The following are the national records in track cycling in Cambodia, maintained by its national cycling federation, Cambodian Cycling Federation.

Men

Women

References

Cambodia
Track cycling
Records